Andre McCarter (born August 25, 1953) is an American retired professional basketball player.

A 6'3" guard born in Philadelphia, McCarter played college basketball at UCLA under coach John Wooden.

McCarter played three season in the National Basketball Association (NBA) for the Kansas City Kings and Washington Bullets.

McCarter's older brother Willie also played in the NBA.

References
Basketball-reference.com stats

Finnish League profile

1953 births
Living people
American expatriate basketball people in Finland
American men's basketball players
Atlantic City Hi-Rollers players
Cleveland Cavaliers draft picks
Continental Basketball Association coaches
Kansas City Kings draft picks
Kansas City Kings players
Maine Lumberjacks players
Point guards
Rochester Zeniths players
UCLA Bruins men's basketball coaches
UCLA Bruins men's basketball players
Utica Olympics players
Washington Bullets players
Basketball players from Philadelphia